CWC may refer to:

Arts and entertainment
 California Writers Club
 Crime Writers of Canada

Businesses and organizations

Businesses
 Central Warehousing Corporation, an Indian government-owned corporation
 Cable & Wireless Communications, a British telecommunications company
 Cuyamaca Water Company, a former water company in California, U.S.

Colleges and universities 
 Central Wyoming College, Riverton, Wyoming, U.S.
 Chellammal Women's College, Tamil Nadu, India
 City of Westminster College, London, UK
 Colorado Women's College, Colorado, U.S.
 Columbia Water Center, a research institute in New York, U.S.
 Clongowes Wood College, Kildare, Ireland

Political organizations
 Ceylon Workers' Congress, a Sri Lankan political party 
 Clyde Workers' Committee, a Scottish workers' organisation during World War I
 Congress Working Committee, the central decision-making body of the Indian National Congress
 CrimethInc., an anarchist group

Other organizations
 Concerned for Working Children, an India-based non-profit organization
 Co-existing with Coyotes, a Stanley Park Ecology Society public education program

Science, technology and mathematics
 CWC mode, a type of encryption
 Cwc, meaning cold subtropical highland climate in the Köppen climate classification

Sport 
 Capitol Wrestling Corporation, a former American professional wrestling body, now known as WWE
 Chess World Cup, a number of different chess tournaments

 Cricket World Cup, an international cricket championship
 FIFA Club World Cup, an intercontinental club football competition
 UEFA Cup Winners' Cup, a defunct UEFA football tournament
 Cruiserweight Classic, a professional wrestling tournament
 Camsur Watersports Complex, Camarines Sur, Philippines

Transportation
 Chernivtsi International Airport, Ukraine, IATA code CWC
 Kickapoo Downtown Airport, Wichita Falls, Texas, U.S., FAA LID: CWC

Other uses
 Cardigan Welsh Corgi, a dog breed
 Chemical Weapons Convention, a 1997 international treaty prohibiting chemical weapons
 Corded Ware culture, a broad archaeological horizon of Europe between c. 2900 BCE – circa 2350 BCE.